Alfred and Plantagenet is a Franco-Ontarian township in eastern Ontario, Canada, in the United Counties of Prescott and Russell.

The township was formed on January 1, 1997, through the amalgamation of Alfred Township, Alfred Village, North Plantagenet Township, and Plantagenet Village.

Plantagenet is from the royal house established by King Henry II.  Settled in 1811-12.  Post office from 1838.

Near the town of Alfred, the Ontario Ministry of Natural Resources has designated the Alfred Bog as "a provincially significant wetland and an Area of Natural and Scientific Interest." Species of interest include the palm warbler, northern pitcher-plant, pink lady's-slipper, cottongrass, bog elfin and bog copper butterflies, and ebony boghaunter dragonfly. It also hosts one of the most southerly herds of moose. The bog is open to the public with a  boardwalk for nature walks.

University of Guelph-Ontario Agricultural College's Alfred College was located here until 2015.

Communities
The township comprises the communities of Alfred, Alfred Station, Blue Corners, Centrefield, Coin Gratton, Curran, Glenburn, Jessups Falls, Lefaivre, Pendleton, Plantagenet, Plantagenet Station, Rockdale, Senecal, The Rollway, Treadwell, Wendover, and Westminster.  The township administrative offices are located in Plantagenet.

Demographics 

See also
 List of municipalities in Ontario
List of townships in Ontario
List of francophone communities in Ontario

References

External links 

Lower-tier municipalities in Ontario
Municipalities in the United Counties of Prescott and Russell
Township municipalities in Ontario